Benton Township is a township in Daviess County, in the U.S. state of Missouri.

Benton Township has the name of Thomas Hart Benton, a Missouri senator.

References

Townships in Missouri
Townships in Daviess County, Missouri